A Fool's Alphabet is a 1992 novel by author Sebastian Faulks. The book splits the life of a photographer (the son of an English soldier) into short, alphabetically arranged episodes based on location as follows:
Anzio, Italy, 1944
Backley, Berkshire, England, 1950
Colombo, Sri Lanka, 1980
Dorking, Surrey, England, 1963
Evanston, Illinois, USA, 1985
Fulham, London, England, 1964
Ghent, Belgium, 1981
Houches, Les, France, 1967
Ibiza, Balearic Islands, 1966
Jerusalem, Israel, 1982
Kowloon, Hong Kong, 1980
Lyndonville, Vermont, USA, 1971
Mons, Belgium, 1914
New York, USA, 1983
Oxford, England, 1976
Paris, France, 1979
Quetzaltenango, Guatemala, 1974
Rome, Italy, 1978
Sorrento, Italy, 1958
Terminal 5, Heathrow Airport, England, 1988
Uzès, France, 1987
Vladimirci, Yugoslavia, 1986
Watsonville, California, USA, 1974
Xianyang, China
Yarmouth, England, 1991
Zanica, Italy, 1970

1992 British novels
Novels by Sebastian Faulks
Hutchinson (publisher) books